Danka Podovac (born 2 July 1982) is a Serbian-Icelandic football midfielder currently playing for ZNK Pomurje.

She began her career in Serbian powerhouse Masinac Nis, with whom she also played the European Cup and later moved to Iceland's Úrvalsdeild in 2006, playing three seasons for Keflavík and one for Fylkir and Þór/KA before signing for ÍBV  in 2011. She is a member of the Serbian national team. She signed for Stjarnan in 2013. In 2014, she received an Icelandic citizenship.

After nearly a decade in Iceland, in 2015 she moved to Östersunds DFF in the Swedish 2nd tier before signing that same year for Slovenian champion ZNK Pomurje.

References

External links

1982 births
Living people
Serbian women's footballers
Women's association football midfielders
Serbia women's international footballers
Expatriate women's footballers in Iceland
Expatriate women's footballers in Slovenia
Expatriate women's footballers in Sweden
Serbian expatriate sportspeople in Slovenia
Danka Podovac
Danka Podovac
Danka Podovac
Danka Podovac
Danka Podovac
ŽNK Mura players
ŽFK Mašinac PZP Niš players